Home and Away is an Australian television soap opera. It was first broadcast on the Seven Network on 17 January 1988. The following is a list of characters that first appeared during 1994, by order of first appearance. They were all introduced by the show's executive producer Andrew Howie. The 7th season of Home and Away began airing on 10 January 1994. The first introduction of the year was Dylan Harris, the son of established character Angel Brooks. Daniel Amalm and Toni Pearen  were introduced in April as Jack Wilson and Beth Armstrong, respectively. Tempany Deckert joined the cast as Selina Cook the following month. Matthew Lilley and Eva Matiuk began playing Rob Storey and Sonia Johnson in July, respectively. Isla Fisher and Shane Ammann arrived as Shannon and Curtis Reed in September. Nicola Quilter began appearing as Donna Bishop in November.

Dylan Parrish

Dylan Parrish (né Harris), made his first appearance on 1 February 1994. Jimmy Lucini originated the role and Jay Patterson later took over. Corey Glaister played Dylan from 1995 until his departure in 1996.

After Paul Harris (Ramsay Everingham), loses custody of Dylan to his mother, Angel Brooks (Melissa George), and Shane Parrish (Dieter Brummer), he decides to hold his son hostage. Dylan is found and taken to the doctor for a routine check-up, he is then diagnosed with leukaemia. George stated "Angel is totally freaked out when she gets Dylan's test results back. Shane comforts her and tells her it's going to be fine." The situation makes Shane realise that Dylan feels like a real son to him. Brummer praised Dylan's portrayer Glaister and called him "good fun" to work with.

Dylan is the son of Angel Brooks and Paul Harris. He was born when Angel was fourteen and raised by his grandmother Anne (Fay Kelton) when Angel gave up custody. Angel tracks Dylan down when he is three years old much to Anne's chagrin. She tells him she is his mother but he refuses to believe her, devastating Angel. Anne eventually relents and lets Angel have access and have Dylan for the odd weekend. Angel's boyfriend Shane Parrish struggles to connect with Dylan at first but soon grows to love him. During his visit, Dylan accidentally spills orange juice all over Donald Fisher's (Norman Coburn) last remaining photos of his late daughter, Bobby Marshall (Nicolle Dickson), leaving Donald upset. On Dylan's next visit to the bay, he locks himself in Donald's car while Shane and Damian Roberts (Matt Doran) babysit him. Several months later, Shane and Angel decide to battle Anne and Paul for custody of Dylan. During this time, he realises that Angel his mother and begins calling her "Mummy". Shane and Angel win custody of Dylan after Paul withdraws due to Anne's attitude towards Angel.

Paul resurfaces several months later and begins a hate campaign against Angel and attempts to kidnap Dylan, but is foiled by Shannon Reed (Isla Fisher). Dylan develops a temperature and begins feeling tired. He is later diagnosed with leukemia and Angel is worried it may be terminal and begins shutting everybody out. Dylan is then christened with Damian and Marilyn Chambers (Emily Symons) as his godparents. Angel contemplates having another child with Paul as a saviour sibling for Dylan. Dylan's leukaemia later goes into remission and Angel discovers she is pregnant with Shane's baby. Prior to a family holiday, Shane collapses and dies while on a day out at the headland leaving Angel and Dylan devastated. Angel later gives birth to a daughter, who she names after Shane. Following an Earthquake, the Parrishes are left homeless and are invited to live with Pippa Ross (Debra Lawrence). Simon Broadhurst (Julian Garner) takes an interest in Angel and asks her to marry him and she accepts. They all leave Summer Bay after a big farewell from all their friends. Dylan asks Angel if they have beaches in England and she tells him yes, but not like the one in Summer Bay.

Jack Wilson

Jack Wilson played by Daniel Amalm made his first appearance on 1 April 1994. Jack was introduced as a new foster child for the characters of Michael (Dennis Coard) and Pippa Ross (Debra Lawrence). Amalm was picked to play Jack from thousands of young actors, despite not being on the list to audition. Amalm was a busker with no acting experience, but he impressed producers so much with his performance that he was given the role of Jack.  In 1996, Amalm left the serial to pursue other projects. Amalm told a reporter from Inside Soap that he was bored of doing monotonous work which was not "his thing". He added that it was too time consuming and wanted to concentrate more on his music. In 2000, Amalm returned to Home and Away; Jack featured in episodes centred around Sally Fletcher's (Kate Ritchie) wedding to Kieran Fletcher (Spencer McLaren). For his portrayal of Jack, Amalm received a nomination for "Most Popular New Talent" at the 1995 Logie Awards. The episode featuring the Summer Bay bushfire caused by Jack was nominated for the Avid Technology Award for "Best Episode in a Television Drama Serial" at the 1996 Australian Film Institute Awards.

Beth Armstrong

Beth Armstrong, played by Toni Pearen, made her first appearance on 25 April 1994. Pearen's casting was announced on 6 March 1994. Sue Williams of The Sun-Herald confirmed that the role would last for eight weeks. Beth is a schoolteacher, whose student Tug O'Neale (Tristan Bancks) develops a serious crush on her. In January 2021, Pearen reminisced about her time on Home and Away and pitched a return storyline for her character. She told Helen Vnuk of TV Week: "Her affair with student Tug [Tristan Bancks] was very illicit, so she was banished. But wouldn't it be nice to see her come back, and she's had this crooked past and she ends up in Summer Bay to redeem herself... with Tug's child? Now there's a plot twist!"

Beth comes to Summer Bay to privately tutor Tug O'Neale when he returns to school after a difficult time, in order to beat his dyslexia. Tug is immediately attracted to her. Beth's colleague Luke Cunningham (John Adam) introduces her to Nick Parrish (Bruce Roberts). Beth and Nick get along well but disaster strikes when Beth crashes her car into Nick's from behind, causing their fenders to lock. Nick is able to pry the cars apart at the expense of Alf Stewart's (Ray Meagher) putter. Beth and Nick's paths cross once again when Nick attends yoga classes held at the school in order to help with his headaches. Tug asks Beth for further tutorials, but refuses to pay if charged and is too proud to accept if the lessons are free. Beth comes up with a solution; Tug teaching her to swim in exchange for the tutorials and he agrees.

Beth is impressed when Tug dives into the sea to save some kittens from being drowned. Beth learns of Tug's feelings from Luke and tells Tug she is his teacher and nothing more. Beth confides in Roxy Miller (Lisa Lackey) about Tug's feelings and Donald Fisher (Norman Coburn) advises Beth to cease teaching Tug. Beth, however, decides to continue as the HSC trials are nearing. After Tug receives a six-month suspended sentence for stealing Roxy's car, he arrives at Beth's flat to tell her and in the excitement he kisses her and she reciprocates. Beth regrets the kiss and tells Tug she will not jeopardise her career over an affair with a student leaving him devastated. When Tug sees Beth with Nick, he accuses him of dating her and reveals he is in love with Beth. This is too much for Beth who resigns from the school and bids Tug farewell, but does not tell him where she is going.

Selina Roberts

Selina Roberts, played by Tempany Deckert. She debuted on-screen during the episode airing on 5 May. Deckert was given the role of Selina after her third audition for the show. In 1996, Deckert fell ill and Louise Crawford played Selina in her absence. .  In 1997, Deckert decided to leave the serial, however briefly returned in 1998 for an episode filmed in Ironbridge, Shropshire, as part of the serial's first ever overseas location filming.
Upon her arrival, Selina was described as being a tearaway with an attitude. For her portrayal of Selina, Deckert was nominated for "Most Popular Actress" at the 1997 Logie Awards. The Newcastle Herald included the 1998 episode of Home and Away, in which Selina and Steven returned in their "TV Highlights" feature.

Rob Storey

Rob Storey played by  Matthew Lilley first appeared on 13 July 1994 and departed on 12 May 1995. Lilley played the role for a year. Three years after he left the series; Lilley said he still received fan mail from European viewers.
A writer from All About Soap said that Rob and Roxy were "the perfect couple".

Sonia Johnson

Sonia Johnson, played by Eva Matiuk, made her first screen appearance on 27 July 1994. Matiuk was a model for several years before she joined the cast of Home and Away as Sonia. Matiuk was three years older than her character. She told Jason Herbison from Inside Soap that Sonia was "no shrinking violet" and called her "a sassy 16-year-old who's out to have a good time! She'll do anything to get what she wants." While dealing with his heart break over a failed relationship, Tug O'Neale (Tristan Bancks) met Sonia. Herbison said that Tug's luck with women was set to change with the student, who put "a spring in his step". Sonia asked Tug out and they had a fling, which put Jack Wilson's (Daniel Amalm) "nose out of joint" because he liked her too. Sonia then became stuck in a love triangle.

Sonia is a student who Tug O'Neale briefly dates. However, Sonia falls for Jack Wilson and breaks up with Tug for him. It soon emerges that Jack is also seeing Selina Cook (Tempany Deckert) and Frankie Brooks (Lenka Kripac). The girls take revenge on Jack for three-timing them by luring him to a caravan and stripping him to his boxers, humiliating him.

Herbison called Sonia a "blonde bombshell" and thought she had the men of Summer Bay "going gaga".

Shannon Reed

Shannon Reed played by Isla Fisher. She made her first on screen appearance on 16 September 1994. She departed on 6 August 1997. Ashley Murray played a young Shannon in flashbacks. Fisher joined the cast of Home and Away in 1994, shortly after completing her role on Paradise Beach, along with co-star Shane Ammann to play the respective roles of Shannon and Curtis Reed. In 1997, Fisher announced she had quit the serial. For her portrayal of Shannon, Fisher received a nomination for "Most Popular New Talent" at the 1995 Logie Awards. In 1997, she was earned a nomination for "Most Popular Actress".

Curtis Reed

Curtis Reed played by Shane Ammann debuted on-screen during the episode airing on 16 September 1994 and departed on 15 April 1997.Ammann joined the cast of Home and Away in 1994, shortly after completing his role on Paradise Beach, along with co-star Isla Fisher to play the respective roles of Curtis and Shannon Reed. Ammann left the serial in 1997 at a time many other cast members decided to quit their roles.  Rachel Browne of The Sun-Herald branded Curtis as "the new stud of Summer Bay High", after he romanced both Chloe and Casey.

Donna Bishop

Donna Bishop played by Nicola Quilter debuted on-screen during the episode airing on 8 November 1994 and departed on 23 June 1995. Quilter joined the cast in 1994.
Actress Kimberley Joseph also auditioned for the part of Donna, but it was Quilter who secured the role. In December 1994, Quilter fractured a bone in her foot when a wall-mounted bed fell onto it. She was given crutches to aid her mobility while it healed. Rachel Browne from The Sun-Herald reported that Quilter's accident had "thrown production schedules into disarray" because the scripts required Donna to be using her feet. The episode featuring the climax of Donna's domestic abuse at the hands of Andrew was nominated for "Best Episode in a Television Drama Serial" at the Australian Film Institute Awards in 1995.

Others

References

External links
Characters and cast at the Official AU Home and Away website
Characters and cast at the Official UK Home and Away website
Characters and cast at the Internet Movie Database

, 1994
, Home and Away